Lipase is a family of enzymes that catalyzes the hydrolysis of fats. Some lipases display broad substrate scope including esters of cholesterol, phospholipids, and of lipid-soluble vitamins and sphingomyelinases; however, these are usually treated separately from "conventional" lipases. Unlike esterases, which function in water, lipases "are activated only when adsorbed to an oil–water interface". Lipases perform essential roles in digestion, transport and processing of dietary lipids in most, if not all, organisms.

Structure and catalytic mechanism
Classically, lipases catalyse the hydrolysis of triglycerides:
triglyceride  +   H2O  →  fatty acid  +  diacylglycerol
diacylglycerol  +  H2O  →  fatty acid  +  monacylglycerol
monacylglycerol  +   H2O  →  fatty acid  +  glycerol

Lipases are serine hydrolases, i.e. they function by transesterification generating an acyl serine intermediate. Most lipases act at a specific position on the glycerol backbone of a lipid substrate (A1, A2 or A3). For example, human pancreatic lipase (HPL), converts triglyceride substrates found in ingested oils to monoglycerides and two fatty acids.

A diverse array of genetically distinct lipase enzymes are found in nature, and they represent several types of protein folds and catalytic mechanisms.  However, most are built on an alpha/beta hydrolase fold and employ a chymotrypsin-like hydrolysis mechanism using a catalytic triad consisting of a serine nucleophile, a histidine base, and an acid residue, usually aspartic acid.

Physiological distribution
Lipases are involved in diverse biological processes which range from routine metabolism of dietary triglycerides to cell signaling and inflammation. Thus, some lipase activities are confined to specific compartments within cells while others work in extracellular spaces.

 In the example of lysosomal lipase, the enzyme is confined within an organelle called the lysosome.
 Other lipase enzymes, such as pancreatic lipases, are secreted into extracellular spaces where they serve to process dietary lipids into more simple forms that can be more easily absorbed and transported throughout the body.
Fungi and bacteria may secrete lipases to facilitate nutrient absorption from the external medium (or in examples of pathogenic microbes, to promote invasion of a new host).
Certain wasp and bee venoms contain phospholipases that enhance the effects of injury and inflammation delivered by a sting.
 As biological membranes are integral to living cells and are largely composed of phospholipids, lipases play important roles in cell biology.
Malassezia globosa, a fungus thought to be the cause of human dandruff, uses lipase to break down sebum into oleic acid and increase skin cell production, causing dandruff.

Genes encoding lipases are even present in certain viruses.

Some lipases are expressed and secreted by pathogenic organisms during an infection. In particular, Candida albicans has many lipases, possibly reflecting broad-lipolytic activity, which may contribute to the persistence and virulence of C. albicans in human tissue.

Human lipases

Uses
In the commercial sphere, lipases are widely used in laundry detergents. Several thousand tons per year are produced for this role.

Lipases are catalysts for hydrolysis of esters and are useful outside of the cell, a testament to their wide substrate scope and ruggedness.  The ester hydrolysis activity of lipases has been well evaluated for the conversion of triglycerides into biofuels or their precursors.

Lipases are of course chiral, which means that they can be used for the enantioselective hydrolysis prochiral diesters. Several procedures have been reported for applications in the synthesis of fine chemicals. 

Lipases are generally animal sourced, but can also be sourced microbially.

Biomedicine
Blood tests for lipase may be used to help investigate and diagnose acute pancreatitis and other disorders of the pancreas.  Measured serum lipase values may vary depending on the method of analysis.

Lipase assist in the breakdown of fats in those undergoing pancreatic enzyme replacement therapy (PERT). It is a component in Sollpura (Liprotamase).

See also
Alpha toxin
Pathology
Lysosomal acid lipase deficiency
Peripheral membrane proteins
Phospholipase A
Phospholipase C
Triglyceride lipase
 Phospholipase A2
 Outer membrane phospholipase A1
 Patatin-like phospholipase

References

25. Gulzar, Bio-degradation of hydrocarbons using different bacterial and fungal species. Published in international conference on biotechnology and neurosciences. CUSAT (cochin university of science and technology), 2003

External links
 

Hydrolases
Peripheral membrane proteins
EC 3.1